The Things We See was a Canadian children's television series on the arts which aired on CBC Television from July to September 1957.

Premise
Alan Jarvis, the National Gallery of Canada's director, hosted this series which encouraged viewers to examine ordinary objects for certain patterns, featuring items from the National Gallery. The series was named for Jarvis' 1947 book The Things We See – Indoors and Out.

Special postcards were sold to viewers to support the 11th episode's theme on colour, given that the CBC was limited to black-and-white broadcasts at that time.

Scheduling
12 episodes of this half-hour series were broadcast on Tuesdays 5:00 p.m. from 2 July to 24 September 1957.

References

External links
 

CBC Television original programming
1957 Canadian television series debuts
1957 Canadian television series endings
1950s Canadian children's television series
Black-and-white Canadian television shows